The 1883 New York state election was held on November 6, 1883, to elect the Secretary of State, the State Comptroller, the Attorney General, the State Treasurer and the State Engineer, as well as all members of the New York State Assembly and the New York State Senate. Besides, a constitutional amendment to abolish contract labor from the state prisons was proposed and accepted with 498,402 votes for and 269,377 against.

History
The Greenback-Labor state convention met on September 5, and nominated Thomas K. Beecher for Secretary of State, Louis A. Post for Attorney General, Gaius L. Halsey for Comptroller, Jurian Winne for Treasurer and Edwin A. Stillman for State Engineer.

The Republican state convention met on September 19 at Richfield Springs, New York. Elbridge G. Lapham was Temporary Chairman until the choice of Warner Miller as President. The incumbents, Secretary of State Joseph B. Carr, Comptroller Ira Davenport, State Engineer Silas Seymour and Attorney General Leslie W. Russell, were re-nominated by acclamation. Pliny T. Sexton was nominated for Treasurer on the first ballot (vote: Sexton 260, Ethan Allen 215).

The Prohibition state convention met on September 26 at Syracuse, New York, and nominated Frederick Gates for Secretary of State, Stephen Merritt for Comptroller, James Baldwin for Treasurer, George A. Dudley for State Engineer and Virgil A. Willard for Attorney General.

The Democratic state convention met on September 27 at Buffalo, New York.

Results
The incumbents Carr and Maxwell were re-elected. The incumbents Davenport, Russell and Seymour were defeated.

Notes

Sources
The tickets: CANDIDATES IN NEW-YORK in NYT on November 5, 1883
Result: COMPLETE VOTE OF THE STATE AS CANVASSED BY THE COUNTY SUPERVISORS in NYT on November 23, 1883
Result: The Tribune Almanac 1884
A possible explanation for Maynards defeat: DEMOCRATS WILL CUT COOK, BECAUSE HE AND HIS FRIENDS SLAUGHTERED JUDGE MAYNARD TWO YEARS AGO in NYT on October 30, 1885

See also
New York state elections

1883
1883 New York (state) elections